The 1921–22 Clarkson Golden Knights men's ice hockey season was the 2nd season of play for the program.

Season
Clarkson's second season was nearly a repeat of its first with a few important differences. On the negative side, the Golden Knights would end up finishing with a losing record. The positives, however, would end up being much more important. While the team was unable to expand on their three game schedule, the number of players doubled. If nothing else, this indicated that the team had a better chance to survive after the initial lineup graduated. A further indication that the team was becoming popular was its inclusion on the school's newspaper. While only a monthly circular at the time, the Clarkson Integrator published the results of the games for the first time in 1922.

The first game for the team was the third meeting with Alexandria Bay. As the previous two had been, it was a close, high-scoring game. However, Clarkson ended up on the losing side for the first time. Despite roaring out to a 5–0 lead in the first, the Golden Knights didn't have the defensive acumen to hold the lead and fell 7–8. captain Bill Johnson was the star of the game with 5 goals to his credit. The Knights had to wait nearly a month for their next game and the time off did not serve the team well. Clarkson was whipped by Hamilton 2–12. The second game was marked by a change in style by the team's defenders shifting from point positions (one in front of the other) to the newer side-by-side arrangement.

Clarkson lists a third game being played that season, a win over an amateur club from Massena. However, according to contemporary reports, three other games, including the one against Massena, were apparently cancelled due to a lack of available ice.

Roster

Standings

Schedule and Results

|-
!colspan=12 style=";" | Regular Season

Scoring Statistics

Note: Assists were not recorded as a statistic.

Goaltending statistics

References

Clarkson Golden Knights men's ice hockey seasons
Clarkson 
Clarkson
Clarkson
Clarkson